The Battle of Drewry's Bluff, also known as the Battle of Fort Darling, or Fort Drewry, took place on May 15, 1862, in Chesterfield County, Virginia, as part of the Peninsula Campaign of the American Civil War. They encountered submerged obstacles, and deadly accurate fire from the batteries of Fort Darling at Drewry's Bluff, which inflicted severe damage on Galena, forcing them to turn back.

Background

In the spring of 1862, Union Major General George B. McClellan launched an amphibious operation against Richmond by landing troops at Fort Monroe and then marching northwest up the Virginia Peninsula. After the fall of Yorktown and the withdrawal of General Joseph E. Johnston's army up the Peninsula, only the Confederate Navy ironclad  prevented Union occupation of the lower James River and Norfolk. When the Confederate garrison at Norfolk was evacuated by Maj. Gen. Benjamin Huger on May 10, Commodore Josiah Tattnall III knew that he could not navigate Virginia through the shallow stretches of the James River toward Richmond, so she was scuttled on May 11 off Craney Island to prevent her capture. This opened the James River at Hampton Roads to Federal gunboats.

The only obstacle protecting Richmond from a river approach was Fort Darling on Drewry's Bluff, overlooking a sharp bend  down river from the city. The Confederate defenders, including marines, sailors, and soldiers, were supervised by navy Commander Ebenezer Farrand and by army Captain Augustus H. Drewry (the owner of the property that bore his name) of the Southside Heavy Artillery. The eight cannons in the fort, including field artillery pieces and five naval guns, some salvaged from Virginia, commanded the river for miles in both directions. An underwater obstruction of sunken steamers, pilings, debris, and other vessels connected by chains was placed just below the bluff, making it difficult for vessels to maneuver in the narrow river.

Battle

On May 15, a detachment of the U.S. Navy's North Atlantic Blockading Squadron, under the command of Commander John Rodgers steamed up the James River from Fort Monroe to test the Richmond defenses.

At 07:45, Galena closed to within  of the fort and anchored, but before Rodgers could open fire, two Confederate rounds pierced the lightly armored vessel. The battle lasted over three hours and during that time, Galena remained almost stationary and took 45 hits. Her crew reported casualties of 14 dead or mortally wounded and 10 injured. Monitor was a frequent target, but her heavier armor withstood the blows. Contrary to some reports, Monitor, despite her squat turret, did not have difficulty bringing her guns to bear and fired steadily against the fort. Naugatuck sustained little damage compared to the Monitor and Galena due to her semi-submersible design, but had to withdraw when her 100-pounder Parrott rifle exploded. The two wooden gunboats remained largely out of range of the big guns, but the captain of Port Royal was wounded by a sharpshooter. Around 11:00, the Union ships withdrew to City Point.

Aftermath

During the battle, Corporal John F. Mackie became the first Marine to earn the Medal of Honor.

The massive fort on Drewry's Bluff had blunted the Union advance just  short of the Confederate capital, at a loss of seven Confederates killed and eight wounded. Richmond remained safe. Some amateur researchers think the Union Army never took advantage of this observation, yet the entire purpose of the expedition was to obtain such information.

The area saw action again during the Siege of Petersburg. The army marched overland, advancing within  of Drewry's Bluff by May 9. From a tactical perspective, Bermuda Hundred allowed a complete amphibious landing with less likelihood of counterattack than a landing five miles closer to Drewry's Bluff and Fort Darling.

Gallery

Notes

References
 Eicher, David J. The Longest Night: A Military History of the Civil War. New York: Simon & Schuster, 2001. .
 Kennedy, Frances H., ed. The Civil War Battlefield Guide. 2nd ed. Boston: Houghton Mifflin Co., 1998. .
 Salmon, John S. The Official Virginia Civil War Battlefield Guide. Mechanicsburg, PA: Stackpole Books, 2001. .
 Sears, Stephen W. To the Gates of Richmond: The Peninsula Campaign. Ticknor and Fields, 1992. .
 National Park Service battle description
 CWSAC Report Update

External links

Battle of  Bluff

Drewry's Bluff
Drewry's Bluff
Drewry's Bluff
Drewry's Bluff
James River (Virginia)
Drewry's Bluff
Drewry's Bluff
United States Marine Corps in the 18th and 19th centuries
1862 in the American Civil War
1862 in Virginia
Confederate States Marine Corps
Drewry's Bluff
May 1862 events